Yu Weiliang (born 17 September 1973) is a former Chinese footballer who played as a goalkeeper for the Chinese national football team.

Career statistics

Club

Notes

International

References

1973 births
Living people
Chinese footballers
China international footballers
Association football goalkeepers
Shanghai Shenhua F.C. players
Beijing Renhe F.C. players
Chinese Super League players